Justus of Urgell (died c. 527 AD) was a Spanish bishop and saint.  He is the first recorded bishop of Urgell, and is thought to have participated in some of the Councils of Toledo, and the councils of Lleida, and Valencia.  He is mentioned by Isidore of Seville, who considered him one of the “illustrious men" of whom he wrote the lives.  According to one tradition, Justus had three brothers who were also saints: Nebridius, bishop of Egara and then bishop of Barcelona; Elpidius; and Justinian.

Justus has been listed in the Roman martyrology on 28 May, his feast day, since ancient times.

References

External links
Saints of May 28: Justus of Urgell 

Year of birth unknown
527 deaths
Catalan Roman Catholic saints
Medieval Spanish saints
Bishops of Urgell
6th-century bishops in the Visigothic Kingdom
6th-century Christian saints